Col du Pillon (el. 1546 m) is a mountain pass in the western Swiss Alps, linking Aigle, Le Sépey and Les Diablerets in the canton of Vaud with Gstaad in the canton of Berne. The pass itself is located within the canton of Vaud, approximately one kilometre from the border with Berne. Col du Pillon is overlooked by the Diablerets and at the pass is located the lower station of the Scex Rouge cable car.

See also
 List of highest paved roads in Europe
 List of mountain passes
List of the highest Swiss passes

External links 

Profile on climbbybike.com

Pillon
Pillon
Mountain passes of the canton of Vaud